JaHyun Kim Haboush  Korean: , ;  1940 in Seoul, Korea – 2011 in New York City) was a Korean-American scholar of Korean history and literature in the United States. Haboush was the King Sejong Professor of Korean Studies at Columbia University when she died on January 30, 2011.

Biography
Haboush attended Ewha Womans University and studied English literature in Seoul. She studied Chinese literature at the University of Michigan, where she graduated with an M.A. in Chinese Literature under the supervision of Professor James Crump in 1970. Haboush obtained her Ph.D. from the Department of East Asian Languages and Cultures at Columbia University in 1978 under Professor Gari Ledyard. She went on to teach at Queens College of the City University of New York, The University at Albany, and the University of Illinois before her return to Columbia as a professor in 2000.

Work
Haboush has contributed extensively to the fields of Korean studies, Korean history and literature, and gender studies.  Her important writings include the books The Confucian Kingship in Korea, the paperback edition of her 1988 monograph, A Heritage of Kings: One Man's Monarchy in the Confucian World on the reign of King Yeongjo of Joseon of the Joseon dynasty, The Memoirs of Lady Hyegyŏng: The Autobiographical Writings of a Crown Princess of Eighteenth-Century Korea, a translation of the Memoirs of Lady Hyegyeong in which Lady Hyegyeong details the events leading to the execution of Crown Prince Sado. Her scholarly work also includes several edited volumes related to the history and literature of early modern Korea, including Culture and the State in Late Chosŏn Korea, Women and Confucian Cultures in Pre-modern China, Korea, and Japan, and Epistolary Korea: Letters from the Communicative Space of the Chosŏn, 1392-1910.

In the summary by her editor (and husband) William Haboush in 2016, she interpreted the decisive impact on Korea of its victories against the Japanese and Manchu invaders:
Out of this great war at the end of the 16th century and the Manchu invasions of 1627 and 1636–1637, Koreans emerged with a discernible sense of themselves as a distinct ethnie united by birth, language, and belief forged by this immense clash of the three great powers of East Asia....Korea arrived at the brink of the seventeenth century as a nation.

Select Bibliography

Books
 The Rise of Neo-Confucianism in Korea (1985). Coeditor. New York: Columbia University Press.
 A Heritage of Kings: One Man's Monarchy in the Confucian World (1988). Columbia UP.
 The Memoirs of Lady Hyegyŏng: The Autobiographical Writings of a Crown Princess of Eighteenth-Century Korea (1996). Berkeley: University of California Press.
 Culture and the State in Late Chosŏn Korea Coeditor. (1999). Harvard Asia Center 
 The Confucian Kingship in Korea (2001). New York: Columbia University Press.
 Women and Confucian Cultures in Pre-modern China, Korea, and Japan. Coeditor. (2003) Berkeley: U of California Press.
 Epistolary Korea: Letters from the Communicative Space of the Chosŏn, 1392–1910. Editor. (2009) New York: Columbia University Press

See also

Martina Deuchler

References

Historians of Korea
1941 births
2011 deaths
Ewha Womans University alumni
University of Michigan alumni
Columbia Graduate School of Arts and Sciences alumni
Columbia University faculty